Apatelodes amaryllis is a moth in the family Apatelodidae. It is found in Mexico (Distrito Federal).

References

Natural History Museum Lepidoptera generic names catalog

Apatelodidae
Moths described in 1907